Saint-Papoul (Languedocien: Sant Pàpol) is a commune in the Aude department in southern France.

History
The town of Saint-Papoul was founded during the 8th century when an abbey was established here, dedicated to Saint Papulus.

The diocese of Saint-Papoul, of which Saint-Papoul Cathedral was the center, was created an episcopal see by John XXII in 1317.

Population

Literature
Saint-Papoul is a location mentioned briefly in the M.R. James short ghost story Canon Alberic's Scrap-Book published in Ghost Stories of an Antiquary in 1904

See also
Communes of the Aude department

References

Communes of Aude
Aude communes articles needing translation from French Wikipedia